The Sinfonietta in C major, Op. 10, is a three-movement composition for string orchestra written in 1932 by the Swedish composer Lars-Erik Larsson. The piece premiered in Gothenburg on 14 December 1932 with Tor Mann conducting the Gothenburg Orchestral Society. A few years later,  on 5 April 1934 at the International Society for Contemporary Music (ISCM) World Music Days in Florence, Hermann Scherchen conducted the Sinfonietta to considerable acclaim, scoring for Larsson the first international success of his career. In response, Universal Edition in Vienna signed a contract with the composer and published a number of his early works, among them the Sinfonietta, the Little Serenade (Op. 12, 1934), and the Concert Overture No. 2 (Op. 13, 1934).

Structure
The Sinfonietta is in three movements. They are as follows:

Instrumentation
The Sinfonietta is scored for the following instruments:
 Strings: violins, violas, cellos, and double basses

Universal Edition published the suite in 1935.

Recordings
The sortable table below lists commercially available recordings of the Sinfonietta:

Notes, references, and sources

  
  

  

Symphonies by Lars-Erik Larsson
20th-century classical music
Classical music in Sweden
1932 compositions
Sinfoniettas